Pneumatic tubes (or capsule pipelines, also known as pneumatic tube transport or PTT) are systems that propel cylindrical containers through networks of tubes by compressed air or by partial vacuum. They are used for transporting solid objects, as opposed to conventional pipelines which transport fluids. In the late 19th and early 20th centuries, pneumatic tube networks gained acceptance in offices that needed to transport small, urgent packages, such as mail, other paperwork, or money, over relatively short distances, within a building or, at most, within a city. Some installations became quite complex, but have mostly been superseded. However, they have been further developed in the 21st century in places such as hospitals, to send blood samples and the like to clinical laboratories for analysis.

A small number of pneumatic transportation systems were built for larger cargo, to compete with train and subway systems. However, they never gained popularity.

History

Historical use 

Pneumatic transportation was invented by William Murdoch around 1799. Capsule pipelines were first used in the Victorian era, to transmit telegrams from telegraph stations to nearby buildings. The system is known as pneumatic dispatch.

In 1854, Josiah Latimer Clark was issued a patent "for conveying letters or parcels between places by the pressure of air and vacuum". In 1853, he installed a  pneumatic system between the London Stock Exchange in Threadneedle Street, London, and the offices of the Electric Telegraph Company in Lothbury. The Electric Telegraph Company used the system to acquire stock prices and other financial information to pass to subscribers of their service over their telegraph wires. The advantage of the pneumatic system was that, without it, the company would have had to employ runners to carry messages between the two buildings, or else employ trained telegraph operators within the Stock Exchange. In the mid-1860s, the company installed similar systems to local stock exchanges in Liverpool, Birmingham, and Manchester. After the telegraphs were nationalised in Britain, the pneumatic system continued to be expanded under Post Office Telegraphs. That expansion was due to Joseph William Willmot (previously employed at the Electric & International Telegraph Company) improving Latimer-Clark's invention in 1870 with the "double sluice pneumatic valve" and, in 1880, the "intermediate signaller/quick break switch for pneumatic tubes", which dramatically speeded up the process, and made it possible for a number of carrier messages to be in the tube at any one time. A tube was laid between the Aberdeen fish market office and the main post office, to facilitate the rapid sale of the very perishable commodity.

While they are commonly used for small parcels and documents, including cash carriers at banks or supermarkets, in the early 19th century, they were proposed for transport of heavy freight. It was once envisaged that networks of massive tubes might be used to transport people.

Contemporary use 
The technology is still used on a smaller scale. While its use for communicating information has been superseded by electronics, pneumatic tubes are widely used for transporting small objects, where convenience and speed in a local environment are important.

In the United States, drive-up banks often used pneumatic tubes to transport cash and documents between cars and tellers; by the 2020s some of these have been removed, obviated by the rise of mobile banking apps and the increasing sophistication of ATMs. Many hospitals have a computer-controlled pneumatic tube system to deliver drugs, documents and specimens to and from laboratories and nurses' stations. Many factories use them to deliver parts quickly across large campuses. Many larger stores use systems to securely transport excess cash from checkout stands to back offices, and to send change back to cashiers. They are used in casinos to move money, chips, and cards quickly and securely. Japanese love hotels use them to allow customers to settle bills anonymously (no face-to-face contact). NASA's original Mission Control Center had pneumatic tubes connecting controller consoles with staff support rooms.  Mission Operations Control Room 2, was last used in its original configuration in 1992 and then remodeled for other missions.  Because the room was designated a National Historic Landmark in 1985, it was decided in 2017 to restore it to its 1960s condition.  The pneumatic tubes were removed and sent to the Cosmosphere in Kansas for restoration.

Pneumatic tube systems have been used in nuclear chemistry to transport samples during neutron activation analysis. Samples must be moved from the nuclear reactor core, in which they are bombarded with neutrons, to the instrument that measures the resulting radiation. As some of the radioactive isotopes in the sample can have very short half-lives, speed is important. These systems may be automated, with a magazine of sample tubes that are moved into the reactor core in turn for a predetermined time, before being moved to the instrument station and finally to a container for storage and disposal.

Until it closed in early 2011, a McDonald's in Edina, Minnesota claimed to be the "World's Only Pneumatic Air Drive-Thru," sending food from their strip-mall location to a drive-through in the middle of a parking lot.

Technology editor Quentin Hardy noted renewed interest  in transmission of data by pneumatic tube accompanied discussions of digital network security, and he cited research into London's forgotten pneumatic network.

Related applications include fish cannons which use mechanisms very similar to pneumatic tube systems.

Applications

In postal service

Pneumatic post or pneumatic mail is a system to deliver letters through pressurized air tubes. It was invented by the Scottish engineer William Murdoch in the 19th century and was later developed by the London Pneumatic Despatch Company. Pneumatic post systems were used in several large cities starting in the second half of the 19th century (including an 1866 London system powerful and large enough to transport humans during trial runs – though not intended for that purpose),  but later were largely abandoned.

A major network of tubes in Paris (the Paris pneumatic post) was in use until 1984, when it was abandoned in favor of computers and fax machines.

Pneumatic post stations usually connect post offices, stock exchanges, banks and ministries. Italy was the only country to issue postage stamps (between 1913 and 1966) specifically for pneumatic post. Austria, France, and Germany issued postal stationery for pneumatic use.

Typical applications are in banks, hospitals and supermarkets. Many large retailers used pneumatic tubes to transport cheques or other documents from cashiers to the accounting office.

 Historical use
 1853: linking the London Stock Exchange to the city's main telegraph station (a distance of  )
 1861: in London with the London Pneumatic Despatch Company providing services from Euston railway station to the General Post Office and Holborn
 1864: in Liverpool connecting the Electric and International Telegraph Company telegraph stations in Castle Street, Water Street and the Exchange Buildings
 1864: in Manchester to connect the Electric and International Telegraph Company central offices at York Street, with branch offices at Dulcie Buildings and Mosley Street
 1865: in Birmingham, installed by the Electric and International Telegraph Company between the New Exchange Buildings in Stephenson Place and their branch office in Temple Buildings, New Street.
 1865: in Berlin (until 1976), the Rohrpost, a system 400 kilometers in total length at its peak in 1940
 1866: in Paris (until 1984, 467 kilometers in total length from 1934). John Steinbeck mentioned this system in The Short Reign of Pippin IV: A Fabrication: "You pay no attention to the pneumatique."
 1871: in Dublin
 1875: in Vienna (until 1956) - including the unrealised corpse network of Zentralfriedhof
 1887: in Prague (until 2002 due to flooding), the Prague pneumatic post
 1893: the first North American system was established in Philadelphia by Postmaster General John Wanamaker, who had previously employed the technology at his department store. The system, which initially connected the downtown post offices, was later extended to the principal railroad stations, the stock exchanges, and many private businesses. It was operated by the United States Post Office Department which later opened similar systems in cities such as New York (connecting Brooklyn and Manhattan), Chicago, Boston, and St. Louis. The last of these closed in 1953.
 Other cities: Munich, Rio de Janeiro, Buenos Aires, Hamburg, Rome, Naples, Milan, Marseille, Melbourne, Tokyo, Osaka, Nagoya, Kobe
 1950s-1989: CIA headquarters (now known as the Old Headquarters Building)

In public transportation
19th century
In 1812, George Medhurst first proposed, but never implemented, blowing passenger carriages through a tunnel. Precursors of pneumatic tube systems for passenger transport, the atmospheric railway (for which the tube was laid between the rails, with a piston running in it suspended from the train through a sealable slot in the top of the tube) were operated as follows:
 1844–54: Dublin and Kingstown Railway's Dalkey Atmospheric Railway between Kingstown (Dún Laoghaire) and Dalkey, Ireland
 1846–47: London and Croydon Railway between Croydon and New Cross, London, England
 1847–48: Isambard Kingdom Brunel's South Devon Railway between Exeter and Newton Abbot, England
 1847–60: Paris–Saint-Germain railway between Bois de Vésinet and Saint-Germain-en-Laye, France

In 1861, the London Pneumatic Despatch Company built a system large enough to move a person, although it was intended for parcels. The inauguration of the new Holborn Station on 10 October 1865 was marked by having the Duke of Buckingham, the chairman, and some company directors blown through the tube to Euston (a five-minute trip).

The  Crystal Palace pneumatic railway was exhibited at the Crystal Palace in 1864. This was a prototype for a proposed Waterloo and Whitehall Railway that would have run under the River Thames linking Waterloo and Charing Cross. Digging commenced in 1865 but was halted in 1868 due to financial problems.

The line only operated for a few months, closing after Beach was unsuccessful in getting permission to extend it – Boss Tweed, a corrupt influential politician, did not want it to go ahead as he was intending to personally invest into competing schemes for an elevated rail line.

 20th century
In the 1920s, the Canadian Pacific and Canadian National Railways cooperated together to lay an elaborate system of 4,500 metre pneumatic tubing between four of their offices to Postal Station A at Union Station in Toronto, Canada. There was also a connection to the mail room at the Royal York Hotel. The newspapers the Star and Telegram joined into the system, laying pipes.
In the 1960s, Lockheed and MIT with the United States Department of Commerce conducted feasibility studies on a vactrain system powered by ambient atmospheric pressure and "gravitational pendulum assist" to connect cities on the country's East Coast. They calculated that the run between Philadelphia and New York City would average 174 meters per second, that is 626 km/h (388 mph). When those plans were abandoned as too expensive, Lockheed engineer L.K. Edwards founded Tube Transit, Inc. to develop technology based on "gravity-vacuum transportation". In 1967 he proposed a Bay Area Gravity-Vacuum Transit for California that would run alongside the then-under construction BART system. It was never built.

 21st century
Research into trains running in partially evacuated tubes, such as the Vactrain and Hyperloop, is continuing.

Pneumatic elevator
A pneumatic elevator  consists of a cylindrical vertical shaft (typically made of transparent plastic), and a passenger capsule (also transparent) within the shaft which moves vertically by means of differential air pressure above and below. The main advantage that it requires neither a pit below or a loft above the shaft.

For ascending operations, a vacuum pump at the top of the elevator shaft creates a low pressure by drawing air from above the capsule while below the greater normal atmospheric pressure is permitted to enter at the lower (ground floor) level below the capsule providing lift.

To descend, electronically controlled valves inside the tubular shaft regulate the entry and exit of air within the cylinder lowering the car smoothly by means of programmed operation. In the event of a failure of the vacuum pump or electronically controlled valves, the trapped volume of air below the capsule acts as a cushion that is allowed to slowly escape by means of a mechanical valve, gently returning the capsule to the lowest level.

In money transfer

In large retail stores, pneumatic tube systems were used to transport sales slips and money from the salesperson to a centralized tube room, where cashiers could make change, reference credit records, and so on.

Many banks with drive-throughs also use pneumatic tubes.

In medicine
Many hospitals have pneumatic tube systems which send samples to laboratories. Blood preservations are transported, where weight and transport duration matter as well as preventing haemolysis caused by centrifugal and accelerating forces. Pneumatic tube systems are also used in hospitals to transport X-rays, patient documents, general documents, drugs and test results.

 pneumatic tube systems have been shown to handle heavy liter-capacity IV bags with significantly fewer jams compared to the  systems.

Department stores
To manage its mail order business the department store Sears built "massive warehouses, like its central facility in Chicago, in which messages to various departments and assembly workers were sent through pneumatic tubes". Many other department stores had pneumatic tube systems in the 20th century, such as Jacksons of Reading and Myer in Melbourne, Australia. The National Library of Australia's building (opened 1968), incorporates a pneumatic tube system for sending book requests from the reading rooms to the book stacks. The system is no longer used, but remains partially operational, and is demonstrated on behind the scenes tours.

Waste disposal 
The use of pneumatic tubes in waste disposal units include the Masjid al-Haram, Mecca, GlashusEtt in the Hammarby Sjöstad area of Stockholm, Sweden, Old Montreal, Canada, Disney World, Florida and Roosevelt Island and Hudson Yards, New York (US).

In production
Pneumatic tube systems are used in production plants. Uses include conveying spare parts, measuring instruments, tools or work pieces alongside conveyor belts or in the production process. In industrial laboratories samples are transported through the pneumatic tube systems. These can be conveyed in any physical state (solid, liquid, gas) and at any temperature.

Technical characteristics

At the same time, varying air pressures allow capsules to brake slowly, removing the jarring arrival that used to characterise earlier systems and make them unsuitable for fragile contents.

More than 100 lines and 1000 stations can be connected.

Further, modern systems can be computer-controlled for tracking of any specific capsule and managing priority deliveries as well as system efficiency. With this technology, time-critical items can be transported, such as tissue samples taken during a surgery in a hospital. RFID chips within the capsules gather data – e. g. about the location of the carrier, its transport speed or its destination. The systems collect and save these data to help users optimize their internal processes and turnaround times. The facilities can be linked to the company's software systems, e.g. laboratory information systems, for full integration into company logistical management and production chains.

See also
 Automated vacuum collection
 Lamson Engineering Company Ltd
 Pipeline transport
 Prague pneumatic post, the world's last preserved pneumatic mail system
 Vactrain
 Cash carrier

References

 M. Marcu-Pipeline conveyors(pneumatic wheeled pipeline conveyors-state of the art/photos-1990) at page 45 in the "Material handling in pyrometallurgy": proceedings of the International Symposium on Materials Handling in Pyrometallurgy, Hamilton, Ontario, August 26–30, 1990
 Twigge-Molecey, T. Price, Metallurgical Society of CIM. Non-Ferrous Pyrometallurgy Section Pergamon Press, Sep 30, 1990 - Technology & Engineering - 227 pages

Further reading
 Archibald Williams, "Pneumatic Mail Tubes", in The Romance of Modern Mechanism, Philadelphia: Lippincott, 1907. Reprinted by Nabu Press, 2010. .

External links

 Site describing Pneumatic Trash and Linen Systems, with photos
 Describes Paris pneumatic post, also mentions others
 "Dial Switches Message Tubes" 1951 article that describes with photos and drawing the basics of how the system operates
 Site describing pneumatic post systems in England, France, Berlin, the US, and Prague, with photos
 Article describing the pneumatic post system in Prague
 Pneumatic mail article from the U.S. National Postal Museum
 The pneumatic dispatch... (1868) by Alfred Beach (scanned pages)
 Beach Pneumatic Alfred Beach's Pneumatic Subway and the beginnings of rapid transit in New York
 Futuristics: Pneumatic Transportation (contains historical illustrations)
 Capsule Pipelines: good historical information, original author of info found on "capsu.org" pages.
 Pneumatic Tube System - How it works
 Cash Railway Website: pneumatic tubes used for cash handling in shops

Pipeline transport
Postal systems
Pneumatics
Postal history